Francisco Bulnes Sanfuentes (8 August 1917 – 28 October 1999) was a Chilean lawyer and politician.

External links
 BCN Profile

1917 births
1999 deaths
People from Santiago
Chilean people of Asturian descent
Conservative Party (Chile) politicians
Traditionalist Conservative Party politicians
United Conservative Party (Chile) politicians
National Party (Chile, 1966) politicians
Movimiento de Unión Nacional politicians
National Renewal (Chile) politicians
Deputies of the XL Legislative Period of the National Congress of Chile
Deputies of the XLI Legislative Period of the National Congress of Chile
Senators of the XLVI Legislative Period of the National Congress of Chile
Senators of the XLVII Legislative Period of the National Congress of Chile
20th-century Chilean lawyers
Pontifical Catholic University of Chile alumni